New In Chess (NIC) is a chess magazine that appears eight times a year with chief editors International Grandmaster Jan Timman and Dirk Jan ten Geuzendam. It began publication in 1984 and contains notes by top players and chess prodigies about their own games. Typical contributions are from players such as Vladimir Kramnik, Viswanathan Anand, Péter Lékó, Judit Polgár, Magnus Carlsen, and Sergey Karjakin.

New In Chess also publishes Yearbooks four times per year that offer opening surveys and theoretical articles. NIC uses its own classification system for chess openings that continues to evolve in the effort to keep abreast of novelties. For example, FR 16.6 is the French Tarrasch with 10...g5 and a "Survey" by Tim Harding appeared in Yearbook 32 (1994). NIC also publishes books on opening theory and other chess topics.

In February 2021, it was announced that Play Magnus Group, owned by chess grandmaster Magnus Carlsen, bought the publisher of New in Chess, Interchess B.V.

See also
 List of chess books
 List of chess periodicals

References

External links
New In Chess

1984 in chess
1984 establishments in the Netherlands
Chess in the Netherlands
Chess periodicals
Magazines established in 1984
Eight times annually magazines
Magazines published in Amsterdam